In chess, an economical mate is a checkmate position such that all of the attacker's remaining knights, bishops, rooks and queens contribute to the mating attack.  The attacker's king and pawns may also contribute to the mate, but their assistance is not required, nor does it disqualify the position from being an economical mate.  Economical mates are of interest to chess problem composers for their aesthetic value.  In real gameplay, their occurrence is incidental.  Nevertheless, some notable games have concluded with an economical mate such as the Opera game, won by Paul Morphy.

In chess problem composition, the concept of an economical mate is motivated by the aesthetic notion of economy of force, the idea that a composition is simpler and more beautiful when it uses minimal material to maximal effect.  When all of the attacker's pieces—apart from the king and pawns—contribute to a checkmate, this also means that none of the more powerful units have been left unused, an economical use of material.

Economical mate is one of a few terms used by composers to describe the properties of checkmate positions; related concepts include pure mate, model mate, and ideal mate.  A pure mate is a position such that the mated king is attacked once and prevented from moving to any of the adjacent squares in its field for exactly one reason per square.  Model mate and ideal mate are both stronger forms of pure mate.  When a checkmate is both "pure and economical", it is said to be a model mate.  When, in a pure mate, all  on the board of either color plays a direct role in the checkmate, it is said to be an ideal mate.

Definition

An economical mate is a checkmate position such that all of the attacker's pieces other than the king and pawns contribute to the checkmate.  This definition neither requires the king or pawns to contribute to the mating attack, nor does it state that their participation disqualifies a position from being an economical mate.  All that is required is that all of the player's other remaining pieces—whether knights, bishops, rooks or queens—play a direct role in the attack on the mated king.

In his Dictionary of Modern Chess, Byrne J. Horton gave a similar definition:

Horton's definition assumes a historical norm in chess problems, in which White is the attacking and mating side, while Black is the mated and losing side.  However, the concept of an economical mate is also applicable to positions in which Black is the mating side.

Examples

The "Opera Game"

In 1858, the American master Paul Morphy visited Europe to play against the continent's leading masters.  Morphy won several matches against Europe's best players, and he also engaged in casual and exhibition play.

The game was played in a box at an opera house while an opera was performed onstage, hence its name. While Morphy controlled the white pieces, his opponents jointly decided each move for the black pieces. In the final position, Morphy's remaining bishop and rook were used to give an economical mate. The position nearly qualifies as a pure mate (and thus as a model mate), but it fails on one point: the black king cannot access f8 both because it is occupied by a friendly bishop, and also because the square is guarded by the checking rook.

The Opera Game is frequently reproduced in chess primers as a tool to teach the importance of rapid development.

The "Immortal Game"

The Immortal Game was a casual game played by Adolf Anderssen and Lionel Kieseritzky in 1851.  Anderssen allowed a double rook sacrifice in order to develop an attack using his remaining .  Hooper, Whyld and Kasparov report that Kieseritzky resigned the game following 20.Ke2.  However, the continuation 20...Na6 21.Nxg7+ Kd8 22.Qf6+ Nxf6 23.Be7# is commonly reported in treatments of the game.  If played, this continuation would have resulted in an economical mate, with the additional property that it is also a pure mate, and thus by definition a model mate.  Kasparov described the continuation as being both "pure" and "economic", two adjectives which, taken together, are synonymous with a model mate.

Keres vs. Fischer, 1959

During the 1959 Candidates Tournament, Paul Keres lost a game to a young Bobby Fischer, which ended with a simple checkmate satisfying the conditions of economical mate.  In the final position, the black queen gave mate with assistance from the black king.  As the black king contributed additional attacking force along the e-file, the final position was neither pure, model, nor ideal.

Notes

Bibliography

References

Further reading
 

Chess checkmates
Chess problems